Kotroman is a village located in the municipality of Užice, Serbia. As of 2011 census, the village has a population of 182 inhabitants. A border crossing between Serbia and Bosnia and Herzegovina is located in the village.

Food Shortage

In August 2003, a food shortage occurred due to the village's main food supply being temporarily suspended. The village sustained itself on the crops it grew for a small amount of time, but there was not enough food to feed the entire village.

Goranka Basia, a woman living in the village took note of how long the shortage lasted. Translated to English from her journal it read, "We have experienced a food shortage in the previous months, I have noted that it lasted close to 68 days."

The food shortage was ended when the food supply was able to deliver food to their village.

References

Užice
Populated places in Zlatibor District